Jalauka (also known as Jaluka) was, according to the 12th century Kashmiri chronicle, the Rajatarangini, a king of Kashmir, who cleared the valley of oppressing Malechas. Jaluka was reputed to have been an active and vigorous king of Kashmir, who expelled certain intrusive foreigners, and conquered the plains as far as Kannauj. Jalauka was devoted to the worship of the Hindu god Shiva and the Divine Mothers, in whose honour he and his queen, Isana-devi, erected many temples in places which can be identified.

Historicity 

The story of Jalauka, notwithstanding the topographical details, is essentially legendary, and no independent corroboration of the Kashmir tradition has been discovered.

Rajatarangini mentions that Jalauka's father and predecessor as Ashoka (Gonandiya). According to the dates given in that text, this Ashoka would have ruled in the 2nd millennium BCE, and was a member of a dynasty founded by Godhara. Kalhana also states that this king had adopted the doctrine of Jina, and appeased Bhutesha (Shiva) to obtain his son Jalauka. Despite these discrepancies, multiple scholars identify Kalhana's Ashoka with the Mauryan emperor Ashoka, who had adopted Buddhism.  Romila Thapar equates Jalauka to the Mauryan prince Kunala, arguing that "Jalauka" is an erroneous spelling caused by a typographical error in Brahmi script.

References

Bibliography 
 
 

Rulers of Kashmir